"I Just Wanna Be with You" is a song by Swedish musician Bo Martin Erik Erikson, known under the pseudonym of E-Type featuring backing vocals by singer Jessica Folcker. Produced by him with Kristian Lundin, it was released as the fourth single from his second album, The Explorer (1996). It was a major hit in several countries, peaking at number 10 in Sweden, number 15 in Finland and it also charted in Romania.

Critical reception
In Music & Medias review of the album, The Explorer, "I Just Wanna Be with You" was described as a "single candidate (…) with Ace of Base-beats".

Music video
A partly black-and-white music video was produced to promote the single, but it doesn't feature Jessica Folcker. It was later published on E-Type's official YouTube channel in April 2016. The video has amassed more than 7,3 million views as of January 2022.

Track listing
 12" single, Europe"I Just Wanna Be with You" (Andre's Boogie Buster Long Mix) – 5:25
"I Just Wanna Be with You" (Andre's Summer Mix) – 5:36
"I Just Wanna Be with You" (Rico & Bear Xplorer Club Mix) – 6:24
"I Just Wanna Be with You" (Single Version) – 3:50 

 CD single, Sweden"I Just Wanna Be with You" (Single Version) – 3:52
"I Just Wanna Be with You" (Andre's Boogie Buster Short Mix) – 5:26 

 CD maxi, Europe'
"I Just Wanna Be with You" (Single Version) – 3:52
"I Just Wanna Be with You" (Andre's Boogie Buster Long Mix) – 5:26
"I Just Wanna Be with You" (Andre's Summer Mix) – 5:37
"I Just Wanna Be with You" (Rico & Bear Xplorer Club Mix) – 6:25

Charts

Weekly charts

Year-end charts

References

 

E-Type (musician) songs
Stockholm Records singles
1997 singles
1997 songs
Reggae fusion songs
English-language Swedish songs